General elections were held in Jamaica on 30 March 1993. The result was a victory for the People's National Party, which won 52 of the 60 seats. Voter turnout was 67.4%.

Results

References

1993 in Jamaica
Elections in Jamaica
Jamaica